1904 Massevitch is a background asteroid from the central region of the asteroid belt. It was discovered on 9 May 1972, by the Russian astronomer Tamara Smirnova at the Crimean Astrophysical Observatory in Nauchnyj, on the Crimean peninsula. It was later named after Russian astrophysicist Alla Masevich.

Orbit 

Massevitch orbits the Sun in the central main-belt at a distance of 2.5–2.9 AU once every 4 years and 7 months (1,662 days). Its orbit has an eccentricity of 0.07 and an inclination of 13° with respect to the ecliptic.

Naming 

This minor planet was named after Russian astrophysicist and astronomer Alla Genrichovna Massevitch (born 1918), vice-president of the Astronomical Council of the former USSR Academy of Sciences (now Russian Academy of Sciences). In the former USSR, Massevitch organized the optical tracking of artificial satellites in Earth's orbit. The official  was published by the Minor Planet Center on 20 February 1976.

Physical characteristics 

The moderately bright R-type asteroid has a surface that strongly absorbs in the olivine and pyroxene spectral region, which give it its very reddish color.

Rotation period 

In September 2014, a rotational lightcurve of Massevitch was obtained from photometric observations taken at the Oakley Southern Sky Observatory  in Coonabarabran, Australia. It gave a rotation period of  hours with a brightness variation of 0.30 magnitude

Diameter and albedo 

According to the surveys carried out by NASA's Wide-field Infrared Survey Explorer with its subsequent NEOWISE mission and the Infrared Astronomical Satellite IRAS, Massevitch measures 13.50 and 18.19 kilometers in diameter, and its surface has an albedo of 0.161 and 0.581, respectively, while the Collaborative Asteroid Lightcurve Link derives an albedo of 0.176 and a diameter of 18.25 kilometers with an absolute magnitude of 11.2.

References

External links 
 Lightcurve Database Query (LCDB), at www.minorplanet.info
 Dictionary of Minor Planet Names, Google books
 Asteroids and comets rotation curves, CdR – Geneva Observatory, Raoul Behrend
 Discovery Circumstances: Numbered Minor Planets (1)-(5000) – Minor Planet Center
 
 

001904
Discoveries by Tamara Mikhaylovna Smirnova
Named minor planets
001904
19720509